Gimel-les-Cascades is a commune in the Corrèze department in central France.

Geography
The A89 motorway and the departmental roads 1089, 53, 53E3, 53E4, 26, and 978 cross Gimel-les-Cascades. The village is located 7 km (4.35 mi) northeast of Tulle and 8 km (4.97 mi) south of Corrèze.
The commune is located in the Massif Central and watered by the Montane which serves as its limit to the southwest separating it from Chanac-les-Mines.

Population

See also
Communes of the Corrèze department

References

Communes of Corrèze
Corrèze communes articles needing translation from French Wikipedia